Live at Birdland is a 2003 live two-disc jazz album by guitarist John Pizzarelli and his trio. The song choices are mostly ballads and jazz standards, performed in the swing medium, mixed up here and there with a few original compositions. Pizzarelli consistently garners favorable reviews from critics at Allmusic, generally receiving 4 stars or more for his albums.

Track listing 
Disc One
"Introduction"
"Just You, Just Me"
"The Frim Fram Sauce"
"This Song Is You"
"Isn't It a Pity?"
"Rhode Island Intro"
"Rhode Island"
"Ray Kennedy Library of Congress Story"
"Gospel Truth"
"Ray Kennedy Dizzy Gillespie Story"
"Tea for Tatum"
"James Taylor Intro 1"
"Don't Let Me Be Lonely Tonight"
"James Taylor Intro 2"
"Mean Old Man"
"Manhattan"
"Rosemary Clooney Story"
"Moonlight Becomes You"
"Final Intro"
"Will You Still Be Mine?"
Disc Two
"Introduction"
"Three Little Words"
"They Can't Take That Away from Me"
"Oh, How My Heart Beats for You"
"The Day I Found You"
"Polliwog Story"
"It's Only a Paper Moon"
"Stompin' at the Savoy"
"Better Run Before It's Spring"
"Grover Kemble Story"
"Headed Out to Vera's"
"Medley: Gee Baby, Ain't I Good to You/Baby, Baby All the Time/Midnight Blue"
"I Like Jersey Best Intro"
"I Like Jersey Best"
"My Castle's Rockin'"
"Baby Just Come Home to Me"

Personnel
John Pizzarellivocals, guitar
Ray Kennedypiano
Martin Pizzarellidouble-bass
Grover Kemblevocals

References

John Pizzarelli albums
Live vocal jazz albums
Live mainstream jazz albums
2003 live albums